Dora Wheeler Keith (née Lucy Dora Wheeler; 1856–1940), also known as Mrs. Boudinot Keith, was a portrait artist, muralist, an illustrator for books and magazines, and designed tapestries for her mother Candace Wheeler's firm Associated Artists.

Biography

Birth, early education, and marriage
Dora Wheeler was born Lucy Dora Wheeler at Nestledown, the Jamaica, Long Island, N.Y. country house her mother Candace Wheeler (née Thurber) built. Artist Sanford Gifford had cradled Dora in his arms and her mother's memoirs remarked "[i]t was inevitable that this child should grow up a painter; it began in her babyhood."

Her mother Candace Wheeler was an author, entrepreneur, and a nationally known expert on decorative textiles and interiors, celebrated for championing women as artists and designers. Her father Thomas Mason Wheeler was a businessman, a "clever progressive man" supportive of his wife and daughter in their artistic aspirations.

Wheeler attended a Quaker school on Stuyvesant Square and subsequently "Miss Haines and Mlle. de Janon's", a New York finishing school. The Wheeler family embarked on an extended European sojourn just after the American Civil War, during which Dora was enrolled at a boarding school in Wiesbaden from age seven to seventeen; she spent summers in Montreux, Switzerland.

According to her mother, an accident on a long flight of marble stairs in Europe "had much to do with Dora's future, for the absolute bodily inaction which seemed to be a condition of her recovery was so at odds with her mental activity that it resulted in the constant use of her pencil. For months she drew incessantly. . . "

Wheeler had already established herself as a young artist with a series of book illustrations and portraits of famous authors when in 1890 she married lawyer Boudinot Keith (1859–1925).  After the marriage she often worked under the name Dora Wheeler Keith, while in later years using the name Mrs. Boudinot Keith for philanthropy such as donating the famous Chase portrait to the Cleveland Museum of Art in 1922, and a collection of 27 Associated Artists textiles to the Metropolitan Museum of Art in 1928. Dora had two children, a son Elisha (killed in the First World War) and a daughter Lois, later Mrs. Clyde V. Simpson.

Art training
 The Wheelers cultivated the company of artists, and were early patrons of the Tenth Street Studio artists who were to be dubbed the Hudson River School.   Family friends of Dora's youth and later her artistic colleagues included Frederic Edwin Church, Sanford Gifford, Jervis McEntee, John Frederick Kensett, John Lafarge, Worthington Whittredge, Albert Bierstadt, George Inness and J. Alden Weir.

As a young lady in New York, Wheeler received private instruction from artist William Merritt Chase, from 1879 to 1881. She and her friends Rosina and Lydia Emmet were Chase's first pupils and he remained her mentor and close friend throughout his life, an inspiring teacher "not only giving exhaustively of his stored knowledge of how to do things, but fostering as well the will to do it." In subsequent years Dora Wheeler and Chase periodically worked together, for instance collaborating on a series of theatrical tableaux at Madison Square Garden to raise funds for the pedestal of the Statue of Liberty in 1884; she also served on the Executive Board of Chase's Shinnecock Hills school.

After her tutelage with Chase, Wheeler studied art in New York at the Art Students League and spent two years at the Académie Julian in Paris. While studying in Paris in 1885 she completed one of her earliest designs depicting women in art and literature for which she was to become famous: Penelope Unraveling her Tapestry At Night inspired by Homer's Oddessy, now the only major tapestry by Associated Artists known to survive.

Career as an artist
Dora Wheeler's first artwork published under her own name was a Christmas card design that won first prize in the Prang competition in 1881. During the 1880s Wheeler enjoyed success as a book and magazine illustrator, and published chromolithographs in Art Amateur. She designed the title page and the illustrations for her mother's books, and for New York publishers such as the Harper and Brothers 1884 edition of Edgar Allen Poe's collected works.

During the 1880s, Dora Wheeler also embarked on a series of portraits of the leading literary lights of her time, including Harriet Beecher Stowe, Frank Stockton, William Dean Howells, Charles Dudley Warner, and Walt Whitman. Her portrait of close Wheeler family friend Samuel Langhorne Clemens, better known by his pen name Mark Twain (executed during her visit to Hartford in 1890), as well as portraits of his wife and daughters, now hang in the Mark Twain House in Hartford, Connecticut.

Dora Wheeler's first major public project was a mural painted on canvas and mounted on the ceiling of the Library of the Woman's Building of the World's Columbian Exposition in Chicago in 1893. The New York Times said of the mural: "[t]here was a time when no woman would ever have dreamed of undertaking a piece of elaborate mural painting. Yet a New York woman —Mrs. Dora Wheeler Keith — has accomplished results in this field which must astonish even the most enthusiastic believer in women's capabilities. It is an extraordinary achievement in its line..." After the fair the mural was reportedly purchased by the New York State commissioner and installed in the capital building in Albany; its current whereabouts are unknown. Wheeler also exhibited the painting Daphne's Nymphs in the rotunda of the Woman's Building.

Dora Wheeler maintained two studios: one a refurbished garret at the Associated Artists headquarters 115 East 23rd Street, and another at the Wheeler's summer retreat in the Catskills. Chase painted his portrait of Dora in her 23rd Street studio, against a shimmering gold backdrop of one of Associated Artists's embroidered fabrics. The painting was intended as an exhibition piece for the 1883 European art season and received a gold medal in Munich; it is now in the Cleveland Museum of Art.

Dora's New York studio became a popular rendezvous for artists, writers, and luminaries of contemporary New York, perhaps her mother thought because of the "novelty of the introduction of the women element." Lily Langtree for whom Dora had designed three silk tapestries featuring Cupids at play was a guest in Dora's studio; "who but Oscar Wilde should wander in one afternoon" (self-invited—Candace speculated nobody was willing to introduce him). John Singer Sargent borrowed her studio for a season, where he painted the portrait La Carmencita now in the Musée d'Orsay, Paris, and the portrait of Beatrix Goelet called The Little Girl and the Parrot. Swedish artist Anders Zorn painted in Dora's studio the year following.

Her country studio was built in a corner of the garden at Pennyroyal, the family summer cabin at the Catskills mountain artist colony called Onteora. Her young nephew Henry L. Stimson used to play with her brother Dunham Wheeler in a corner of the summer house nicknamed "the Armory"; she painted Stimson's portrait as a child. She also painted portraits of many celebrated visitors; her chalk drawing of Mark Twain survives on the east wall at the summer house Pennyroyal.

Dora and her mother Candace were inseparable; they collaborated on art and business endeavors and lived together most of their lives, even after Dora's marriage to Boudinot Keith: "the two were so close it is hard to delineate where Candace Wheeler ended and Dora Wheeler began." Dora was the primary figure designer for textiles for her mother's enterprise Associated Artists, producing tapestry designs including those used in the parlor of the Vanderbilt Mansion. Her needlewoven tapestries showing Minnehaha, the Winged Moon, and The Birth of Psyche, hung in a London exhibition of American Art with John Lafarge stained glass windows.

She was elected an academician of the National Academy of Design in 1906.

Death
Dora Wheeler died in December 1940. She was survived by her daughter, Mrs. Clyde V. Simpson; two nieces, Miss Candace Stimson and Mrs. George Riggs of Port Washington; and by her nephew Henry L. Stimson, then  Secretary of War serving President Franklin Roosevelt on the eve of the Second World War.

Gallery and museum collections

Little is left of the tapestries and nothing known of the mural for which Dora Wheeler Keith was most famous in her day. She is now known primarily for portraits represented in the collections of the Brooklyn Museum, the Boston Museum of Fine Arts, the Boston Public Library, the New York Historical Society, the Metropolitan Museum of Art, Princeton University, the Smithsonian Institution National Portrait Gallery, the High Museum of Art, and in private collections.

Notes

References

  
  

1856 births
1940 deaths
American portrait painters
American women painters
19th-century American women artists
20th-century American women artists